A heptalogy (from Greek ἑπτα- hepta-, "seven" and -λογία -logia, "discourse"), also known as a septology, is a compound literary or narrative work that is made up of seven distinct works. While not in wide usage, it has been used to describe such examples as the Harry Potter series of books, and The Chronicles of Narnia.

Examples

See also

 Trilogy
 Tetralogy
 List of feature film series with seven entries

References

 
Books by type
Film series
Literary series
Musical form
Narrative forms
Series of books